The 2009 TPG Tour was the third season of the TPG Tour, the main professional golf tour in Argentina since it was established in 2007.

Schedule
The following table lists official events during the 2009 season.

Notes

References

Golf in Argentina
TPG Tour
TPG Tour